The 2006 Russian football season, saw CSKA Moscow competed in the Russian Premier League, Russian Cup, the UEFA Cup and the UEFA Champions League.
CSKA defended their Premier League and Cup crown as well as winning the Russian Super Cup, to complete a Domestic Treble.

Squad

Out on loan

Transfers

Winter

In:

 

Out:

Summer

In:

Out:

Competitions

Russian Super Cup

Russian Premier League

Results by round

Results

League table

Russian Cup

2005-06

2006-07

Round 16 took place during the 2007 season.

UEFA Champions League

Qualifying rounds

Group stage

Statistics

Appearances and goals

|-
|colspan="14"|Players that left CSKA Moscow on loan during the season:
|-
|colspan="14"|Players who appeared for CSKA Moscow no longer at the club:

|}

Goal scorers

Clean sheets

Disciplinary Record

References

2006
CSKA Moscow
Russian football championship-winning seasons